The Young Kieslowski is a 2014 romantic comedy film written and directed by Kerem Sanga and starring Ryan Malgarini, Haley Lu Richardson, Joshua Malina, Melora Walters, and James Le Gros. It is loosely inspired by the story of his own parents.

The film premiered at the 2014 Los Angeles Film Festival, where it won the Audience Award for Best Narrative Feature.

It has been picked up for distribution by Mance Media, with a planned theatrical and digital release on July 24, 2015.

Plot
The Young Kieslowski is a relationship comedy about Brian Kieslowski and Leslie Mallard, both undergraduates at Caltech, and both socially awkward virgins.  At a party, they meet and hook-up.  Afterwards, Leslie discovers that she is pregnant with twins, and decides she wants to keep them.  Brian, in his first relationship and out of his depth, does what he believes is the right thing.  He pretends to support her in her decision, while secretly hoping that she will change her mind.  The two of them then embark on a California road trip to break the big news to both of their uniquely dysfunctional families.

Cast
 Ryan Malgarini – Brian Kieslowski
 Haley Lu Richardson – Leslie Mallard
 Joshua Malina – Robert Kieslowski
 Melora Walters – Barbara Kieslowski
 James Le Gros – Walter Mallard
 Osric Chau – Hanyeoul Cho
 Jessica Lu – Hi Jing
 John Redlinger – Charles
 Sam Aotaki – Judo Girl
 Billy Scafuri – James
 Patrick Rutnam – Ravi

References

External links
 Strauss, Bob. (2014, June 22). LA Film Festival 2014: ‘Uncertain Terms,’ ‘The Young Kieslowski’ tributes to teen pregnancy. Los Angeles Daily News
 Ziemba, Christine N. (2014, June 15). Film Reviews: Smaller Films on the Big Screen at the Los Angeles Film Festival. LAist
 

2014 films
2014 romantic comedy-drama films
American romantic comedy-drama films
Films about virginity
Films scored by John Swihart
Films set in Pasadena, California
2010s English-language films
2010s American films